Sitou Township is a township of Yangcheng County, Shanxi province, China. , it has 14 villages under its administration:
Sitou Village
Nanshu Village
Beixiazhuang Village
Zhangjiazhuang Village
Anshang Village
Dongjialing Village
Qianshishan Village
Laomeng Village
Zhu Village
Shudi Village
Jizhuang Village
Mazhai Village
Sanhe Village
Xinfeng Village

See also
List of township-level divisions of Shanxi

References

Township-level divisions of Shanxi
Yangcheng County